The 1990 Refuge Assurance League was the twenty-second competing of what was generally known as the Sunday League.  The competition was won for the first time by Derbyshire County Cricket Club.

Standings

Batting averages

Bowling averages

Refuge Assurance Cup

Following the end of the Sunday League season, the top four teams in the Sunday League competed for the Refuge Assurance Cup. Middlesex emerged as victors, defeating Derbyshire in the final.

See also
Sunday League

References

Refuge Assurance League
Pro40